Pedro Sarmiento (b. 1956) is a former Colombian football player.

Pedro Sarmiento may also refer to:

Pedro Sarmiento (cardinal) (c. 1478–1541)
Pedro Sarmiento de Gamboa (1532–92), explorer
Pedro Sarmiento, 3rd Marquis of Mancera (c. 1625–1715)